The North South Foundation (NSF) is a nonprofit organization whose main goal is to provide disadvantaged children living in India with college scholarships. The organization raises funds by holding educational competitions made up of participants of Indian background in the United States. Besides educational competitions, NSF conducts workshops and online coaching programs in several subjects. NSF was founded in 1989 by Dr. Ratnam Chitturi and is driven by volunteers.

Regional educational contests are held in over 89 centers in various cities generally during March–April and the National Finals is held in a major university during summer.

Spelling  Bee
The spelling bee has two divisions, junior and senior. Both divisions have the same rules. The senior spelling bee has harder words. In the regional stages, there is a written round (25 questions for each contestant) and an oral round (6 questions for each contestant). The contestants in the oral round will have 30 seconds to spell their word. In the finals there is a written round (30 words per contestant), an oral round (3 words per contestant), and a final elimination phase based on scores from the first two rounds, which is similar to the Scripps National Spelling Bee. The winner is the last one standing.

Math Bee
There are 3 divisions based on education level. Contests are held in two phases. In Phase 1, all contestants get a question paper with 20 questions which must be completed in 35 minutes. In Phase 2 contestants are given 15 multiple choice questions which must be answered in 15 minutes. In the finals, for Phase 1, contestants are given 25 questions to be completed in 45 minutes.  For Phase 2 contestants get 20 multiple choice questions. Division 1 contestants (junior level) get 20 minutes to answer the questions. For other divisions, Phase 2 is a lightning round with questions projected on a screen one by one and the contestants have only 45 seconds to answer each question.

Vocabulary Bee
There are 2 divisions of vocabulary bee. There are 2 phases to the vocabulary bee at the regional level. Phase 1 is a written test consisting of 25 words, while phase 2 is an oral round where each contestant gets 8 questions. Contestants have to select the correct meaning of the word out of the multiple choices provided. At the national level there are three phases. Phase 1 is a written contest with 30 questions to be completed in 20 minutes and Phase 2 is an oral round with 3 questions for each contestant. Contestant gets 30 seconds to answer a question. Phase 3 is an oral elimination round.

Geography Bee
There are two divisions of the geography bee. There is a written phase with 25 questions for which contestants get 30 minutes and an oral phase where contestants get 5 questions. At Nationals, there are 30 questions written and 3 oral questions. The top 10 cumulative scores are added to the Final Round. 
The Geography Bee at North South Foundation is alleged by some contestants to be substantially harder  than the National Geographic Bee, and many Indian-American winners of the National Geographic Bee have been a successful contestant of the North South Foundation Geography Bee.

Essay Writing Bee
In Essay Bee, there is a level 1, a level 2, and a level 3. In finals and regionals contestants get 10 minutes after the topic is announced to plan it. They then get 60 minutes to write the essay. Judges score them and then average the scores and announce the winners.

Public Speaking Bee
There are two levels, Level 1, and Level 2. Contestants get 30 minutes to plan, and up to 3.5 minutes to say their speech before points are deducted. Just like Essay Writing, judges give scores, then average them, and announce winners.

Science Bee
The Science Bee contest was introduced in the year 2010 and is aimed at nurturing the interest and understanding of Science among children in grades 1 through 8. Science bee is split into 3 levels based on grade. The grade eligibility is determined as of February 1.

Brain Bee
The Brain Bee is aimed at motivating students to learn about neuroscience, and there are two divisions.  Students are quizzed on the brain and its variety of functions. It is open to middle and high schoolers.

Finals
The winners of the above contests, and people who make a certain cutoff score in the regionals will go to the finals, conducted on a University campus throughout America. The 2020 National Finals were scheduled to take place in August at the University of Washington in Seattle, Washington, but were cancelled due to the COVID pandemic. The 2021 National Finals took place online with each contest being overseen by a different region.

Past Locations
Cambridge, Massachusetts - Massachusetts Institute of Technology (2019, 2008)
College Park, Maryland - University of Maryland, College Park (2018, 2009)
Houston, Texas - University of Houston (2017)
Tampa, Florida - University of South Florida (2016)
Columbus, Ohio - Ohio State University (2015, 2007)
Richardson, Texas - University of Texas at Dallas (2014)
Durham, North Carolina - Duke University (2013)
Ann Arbor, Michigan - University of Michigan (2012)
San Jose, California - San Jose State University (2011)
Glassboro, New Jersey - Rowan University (2010)
Evanston, Illinois - Northwestern University (2005, 2006)
Tempe, Arizona - Arizona State University (2004)

Impact
The North South contests have been credited by numerous former winners of the Scripps National Spelling Bee, the National Geographic Bee, and various other national level academic tournaments for providing a foundation to gain proficiency in those fields.  From 2008 to 2019, at least one winner per year of the Scripps National Spelling Bee had been an NSF alumnus.  Likewise, NSF alumni have been among the finalists of the National Geographic Bee from 2012 to 2019.

Scholarship Program
North South has an active scholarship program in India. All profits from the contests go to the scholarship program. As of 2018, the foundation has awarded more than 20,000 scholarships to kids in India. They usually select poor underprivileged students with high academic talent.

References

External links
Official site

Educational foundations in the United States
Indian-American history
Foreign charities operating in India